Čajniče is a town and municipality located in Republika Srpska, an entity of Bosnia and Herzegovina. As of 2013, the town has a population of 2,401 inhabitants, while the municipality has 4,895 inhabitants.

Settlements
Aside from the town of Čajniče, the municipality includes the following settlements:

 Avlija
 Batkovići
 Batotići
 Batovo
 Bezujno
 Borajno
 Brezovice
 Bučkovići na Bezujanci
 Đakovići
 Glamočevići
 Gložin
 Hunkovići
 Ifsar
 Kamen
 Kapov Han
 Karovići
 Krstac
 Lađevci
 Luke
 Međurječje
 Metaljka
 Milatkovići
 Miljeno
 Mištar
 Podavrelo
 Ponikve
 Prvanj
 Slatina
 Staronići
 Stopići
 Sudići
 Todorovići
 Trpinje
 Tubrojevići
 Zaborak

Demographics

Population

Ethnic composition

Notable people
 Hanka Paldum, Bosnian singer

See also
Municipalities of Republika Srpska

References

 Official results from the book Ethnic composition of Bosnia-Herzegovina population, by municipalities and settlements, 1991. census, Zavod za statistiku Bosne i Hercegovine - Bilten no.234, Sarajevo 1991.

External links

 
Populated places in Čajniče